For details of rivers of the United Kingdom, see

 List of rivers of England
 List of rivers of Scotland
 List of rivers of Wales
 Northern Ireland: see List of rivers of Ireland and Rivers of Ireland
 Longest rivers of the United Kingdom

Overseas territories
 Rivers of the Falkland Islands
 List of rivers of Montserrat

 Rivers

he:בריטניה הגדולה#נהרות